The Ape Woman is a 1964 Italian-French drama film directed by Marco Ferreri. It was entered into the 1964 Cannes Film Festival. The film was inspired by the real-life story of Julia Pastrana a 19th-century woman exploited as a freak show attraction by her manager Theodore Lent.

In 2008, the film was selected to enter the list of the 100 Italian films to be saved.

Plot
Marie, the "Ape Woman", is completely covered with hair; the entrepreneur Focaccia discovers her in a convent in Naples; he marries her (a condition imposed by the nuns) and begins exhibiting her to the public. He tries to sell her to a man who insists on her virginity, but she is a little reluctant. After tasting success in Paris, she dies during childbirth. Focaccia recovers her mummy from the museum of natural history and exhibits it in Naples.

Cast
Ugo Tognazzi as Antonio Focaccia
Annie Girardot as Maria
Achille Majeroni as Majoroni
Filippo Pompa Marcelli as Bruno
 as Sister Furgonicino (as Linda De Felice)
Elvira Paolini as Chambermaid
Ugo Rossi as Ponszoner

Release
The Ape Woman was released in 4K restoration on Blu-ray and digital platforms on 11 October 2021.

See also
Bearded lady

References

External links

1964 drama films
1960s Italian-language films
1960s French-language films
French black-and-white films
Italian black-and-white films
Films directed by Marco Ferreri
Films with screenplays by Rafael Azcona
1960s multilingual films
French multilingual films
Italian multilingual films
1960s French films
1960s Italian films
French-language Italian films